Darren Louttit (born 26 March 1965) is a former Australian rules footballer who played with Melbourne and Fitzroy in the Victorian Football League (VFL).

Notes

External links 
		
DemonWiki page

1965 births
Australian rules footballers from Victoria (Australia)
Melbourne Football Club players
Fitzroy Football Club players
Living people